Puntamba Junction railway station in Rahata taluka of Ahmednagar district, Maharashtra, India, is a major railway station on the Daund–Manmad branch line and connecting to Sainagar Shirdi railway station.

Passenger facilities

The station has one general waiting room and a food stall.

References

 Indian Railway Route Map

Solapur railway division